Carmel College is a co-educational Catholic secondary college situated in Thornlands, Redland City in Queensland, Australia. Established in 1993 under Brisbane Catholic Education, the college is the only Catholic secondary college in the Redland City area.

As of 2020, 99 teachers and 32 non-teaching staff were working at the college with over 1230 students enrolled over years 7 to 12. Across these enrolments, 45% were male and 55% were female, with 3% of the total student population being of Indigenous background. In 2019, the college received an average of 91% attendance across the school year, with over 67% of students receiving an attendance rate of over 90%. In addition to this, 172 Year 12 students received a Queensland Certificate of Education (QCE) in 2019.

As of 2022, Carmel College's administrative team consists of College Principal Stephen Adair, Deputy Principal Bree Brockenshire, Assistant Principal - Religious Education Krystyna Baldwin, Assistant Principal - Students Sian Burke, Assistant Principal - Junior Curriculum Leree Mazzer and Assistant Principal - Senior Curriculum James Taylor.

History 

The land for Carmel College was purchased in June 1985 by Brisbane Catholic Education. When the school was first proposed, the demand for a Catholic secondary school in the Redlands area was on the rise. The area did not have a Catholic secondary school and plans to open Carmel College had support from the community. Foundation Principal Faye Conley was engaged and made responsible for its establishment, including scouting the location and construction of the initial buildings. The cost of the first stage of the College was $2.1 million.

On 2 February 1993, Carmel College began operations with an enrolment of 80 students, 11 members of staff and four buildings.  A liturgy was held in the pavilion area, with students from the foundational four pastoral care classes being presented with special Carmel College badges.

On 24 July 1993, the blessing and opening ceremony of the College was held in the front car park with representatives from the Queensland Government, Redland City Council, Brisbane Catholic Education and staff, students and parents in attendance.

In mid-2003, the College received its first website. At the beginning of the 2005 school year, the student population was 771.

In 2006, Faye Conley retired after over a decade at the college. She was succeeded by Berenice McLellan.

During the 2008 school year, the students population was 805.

In 2010, a major expansion to many of the school's facilities was made.

At the end of the 2011 school year, Berenice McLellan left the college. She was succeeded by Brian Eastaughffe the following year.

On 20 December 2011, the College library was burnt down in a suspected arson attack from gasoline spillage in a nearby locker. This took a great loss to the college's library, learning support facilities and counselling rooms as well as the entire book collection, two-thirds of the textbooks needed for the next year and five computers housed in the library. All four library staff spent the remainder of the Christmas holidays replacing lost items and were able to replenish around 90% of the textbooks for 2012.

In early 2012, the student population was around 830.

On 20 July 2012, Carmel College celebrated its 20th Foundation Day, marking the College's 20th anniversary. The large-scale ceremony and mass hosted at the school was led by Archbishop Mark Coleridge.

At the beginning of the 2015 school year, the student population was 1125 students.

In July 2015, Carmel College hosted the 2015 Queensland Independent Secondary Schools Netball (QISSN) Carnival. The carnival was held at the Brisbane Entertainment Centre at Boondall, as the scale of the event was unable to be held at the school.

On 25 August 2015, the college opened the brand new $3.1 million library. In addition to this, a new home economics building, science building extension and renovations to the former cooking rooms to make way for a renovated visual art facility were also built and opened. This $5.7 million expansion of the school's facilities were made to help cater to the new Year 7 students.

On 20 July, 2017, the College celebrated its 25th Foundation Day, marking the College's 25th anniversary. Foundation Principal Faye Conley, Quandamooka elder Aunty Joan Hendriks and past students actor Lincoln Lewis, Queensland Firebirds player Jemma Mi Mi and local doctor Amy Heales attended the celebrations.

In September 2017, the construction of stage one of the new H Block Senior Learning Facilities began. This was completed in October 2019, which included the demolition of the tuck-shop building and construction of a new one and the construction of a new staff car park. This marked the completion of the 2-year multi-stage construction of the new H Block complex.

In 2018, Stephen Adair, former head of secondary at Emmaus College, Jimboomba, succeeded Brian Eastaughffe as principal of the College, as he moved to the role of principal at Clairvaux MacKillop College.
In late 2019 to early 2020, the original administration building was demolished for the construction of a new, double-storey admin building, which was completed in January 2021.

From the 20 April to the 23 May 2020, and on several other occasions through 2021 and 2022, students participated in remote online learning due to the directions in regards to the COVID-19 global pandemic.

In 2022, the College celebrated its 30th Foundation Day, marking its 30th anniversary. The enrolment at this time was around 1250 students.

Culture

Namesake 
The college derives its name from Mount Carmel, a place with religious significance in Christianity.

Logo 
The college logo consists of a crimson oval with the image of a lighthouse on the inside. This oval represents the security of family and faith. The lighthouse is located on a green hill representing Mount Carmel, showing that students should be a beacon for others through leading by example in faith. In the top left corner, the glowing yellow cross represents Jesus, the focus of Catholic life. The stars on either side of oval represent the light the shines upon us, with the college motto "Let Your Light Shine" inscribed upon the bottom.

Catholic identity 
The College has a strong Catholic identity within its Carmelite and Marist traditions. This is reflective of the College's dual-charisms, Carmelite and Marist.

Rituals and ceremonies 
As Carmel College observes a proud Catholic history, the college holds many annual masses and liturgies in celebration of certain events.

 At the beginning of each year, the college holds its annual Opening School Mass and Commissioning of College Leaders at the Chandler Theatre in the Sleeman Sports Complex in Chandler. During this ceremony, the college is opened for the year, followed by the Year 12 cohort receiving their senior ties and the college Leaders receiving their special senior blazers.
 At the end of the first term there is an Easter Liturgy and art performance recounting the Easter story and the final days of Jesus.
 On the week of ANZAC Day, there is an ANZAC Day Liturgy held, paying great reverence to the eternal ANZAC tradition and commemorating all fallen in combat. Veterans, service personnel of the Defence Force and RSL representatives attend the ceremony as well as cadets from local areas. Speeches are observed from those close to the cause.
 In the first week of the third term, the annual Foundation Day celebration takes place. This is followed by a market stalls event in the noon and the "Carmel's Got Talent" talent contest in the afternoon.
Each year, the college holds its annual academic and spots awards ceremonies.
In the Year 12's final week, a graduation ceremony is held in attendance of parents and staff.

Co-curricular activities 
Carmel College offers co-curricular activities, which are divided into sport, arts and social justice categories.

Sport 

Every year, the college holds the inter-house athletics, swimming and cross-country carnivals.

 The college holds its swimming carnival at the Brisbane Aquatics Centre at the Sleeman Sports Complex in Chandler in the first weeks of the year.
The college holds its annual cross-country carnival.
 The college athletics carnival is held over the course of two days at the conclusion of the second school term.

The college participates in several inter-school sporting activities at the local and state levels. 
 SECA - South East Colleges Association Sport
 QISSN - Queensland Independent Secondary Schools Netball
 Queensland All Schools Touch Football
 ADP - Athlete Development Program 
 Bayside Districts
 Metropolitan East School Sport

The Arts 
Arts Co-Curricular is the centralised arts program at Carmel College. It contains all areas of music, drama, dance, visual art, public speaking and debating.

Biennially, the college presents a large scale stage performance of a musical of choice. These are hosted in what are years that end in even numbers. These musicals are performed at the Redlands Performing Arts Centre in Cleveland with some of the previously hosted musicals including "Annie" (2018), "Peter Pan" (2016), "Oliver" (2012), "Sherwoodstock" (2008) "Back to the 80's" (2006) and "Little Shop of Horrors" (2004). These shows are labelled as "astonishing", "exceptionally professional" and "thoroughly enjoyable" by the audience. The College will presented "High School Musical: On Stage!" in 2022.

The college participates in the following special events;
 Queensland Debating Union
 Rostrum Voice of Youth
 Lions Youth of the Year
 The United Nations Youth Security Council Competition
 Optiminds

Social justice 
The Carmel College engages in various social justice initiatives, including:
Mini Vinnies
Annual School sleepout
Winter blanket appeal
St Vincent de Paul Society's Christmas Appeal
Caritas' Project Compassion
Catholic Mission

Carmivale 
Immersions to Samoa and Cherbourg 
Visits to the Cleveland Gardens retirement village
NAIDOC week
Reconciliation week
Annual social justice afternoon

Pastoral system 
Carmel College's pastoral care system is based on the value and individualism of each student. This is based upon the college's mission, ensuring that all students are encouraged in their spiritual, intellectual, emotional and social development.

House system 
Carmel College has five distinctive house groups, of which, students become part of for their time at the college. These houses compete against each other during inter-house athletics, swimming and cross-country events, as well as supplying a powerful community for all students to be a member of. Each group is represented by a colour, symbol, house motto, slogan and a house patron; who usually aligns with the college's mission and vision, and those who have made a contribution to social justice.

Pastoral Care 
At the beginning of the school year 2021, the college changed its pastoral care structure to vertical classes. All students are allocated to pastoral care group, consisting of students from all year levels with 12 groups per house. For 20 minutes every morning, they spend time with this group, similar to a homeroom class. Students remain in this class for the entirety of their time at the college.

The four college pillars 
The college's entire culture and community is built upon the ideals outlined in the college's Four Pillars. The students' embodiment of these ideals aim to provide them with qualities and skills which will make them well-rounded, thoughtful and productive members of both the college and the wider communities. The four pillars are Respect, Resilience, Diligence and Positive Relationships.

Notable students 

 Lincoln Lewis, actor, known for role on Home and Away (1999 - 2004)
Jemma Mi Mi, Australian Netball Player (2009 - 2014)
Paige Leonhardt, Australian Paralympic and Commonwealth Swimmer (2017 - 2019)

References

External links 
Carmel College Website
ACARA School Profile 2019

Educational institutions established in 1993
Catholic secondary schools in Brisbane
Schools in South East Queensland
1993 establishments in Australia